Robert Deroy Windham (November 25, 1942 – April 7, 2016), better known by his ring name Blackjack Mulligan, was an American professional wrestler and American football player. He was the father of wrestlers Barry and Kendall Windham, father-in-law of Mike Rotunda, and the maternal grandfather of Bo Dallas and Bray Wyatt.

American football career 
As a young man, Windham played football at Texas Western College, now known as the University of Texas at El Paso. Windham served a tour of duty in the United States Marine Corps, serving in Guam. He then went on to play for the New York Jets during the 1966 pre-season and received tryouts with the New Orleans Saints and Denver Broncos.

Professional wrestling career 
After football, at the urging of Wahoo McDaniel, Windham trained with Joe Blanchard in Corpus Christi, Texas and later with Verne Gagne and became a professional wrestler in the American Wrestling Association. Billed as being 6' 9" and over 300 pounds, Windham was a raw-boned cowboy in the vein of Bobby Duncum or Stan Hansen.

His training complete, he prepared to move on to the World Wide Wrestling Federation (WWWF) in 1971 and was transformed into "Blackjack Mulligan". Mulligan donned black trunks, black hat, a black fingerless glove, moustache and used the iron claw submission hold.

When he arrived in the WWWF, he was managed by The Grand Wizard. Early stills of the two actually identify him as "Big Bob Windham". Mulligan went on to great success in the Northeast and was an early challenger to newly crowned champion Pedro Morales. His push was interrupted when he was slashed in the thigh by a fan at the Boston Garden and required hundreds of stitches to close the wound. The culprit was actually captured by Gorilla Monsoon, who threw him at the ringside police – who promptly let him go because they thought "it was part of the show".

Before he left to recover from his wound, Mulligan participated in a Madison Square Garden match against Bruno Sammartino, who was making his first appearance at the arena since the end of his nearly eight-year championship reign. Mulligan attacked Sammartino before the bell. Sammartino quickly recovered, slammed Mulligan twice and pinned him in 64 seconds. In wrestling terms, everybody "got over" – the building was sold out to the delight of promoter Vincent J. McMahon, Sammartino made a strong return to New York and Mulligan, who was in no condition to work an actual match, received a large pay-off to aid his recovery.

Once he healed, Mulligan returned to the Midwest and tagged with Blackjack Lanza to form The Blackjacks. Although Mulligan was the much bigger star, the duo went on to capture numerous tag team championships in various NWA affiliated promotions as well as the WWWF World Tag Team Championship in August 1975.

Blackjack returned to singles wrestling in the Jim Crockett Promotions where he would go on to hold the NWA United States Heavyweight Championship and the Mid-Atlantic's version of the NWA World Tag Team Championship with Ric Flair.

Mulligan often battled André the Giant, feuding in many different regions in the early 1980s. When they brought their feud to the WWF (formerly the WWWF) in 1982, Windham was noted as saying Andre had no limit to his strength. Mulligan then wrestled in Florida. He often teamed with West Texas stars Dusty Rhodes, Dick Murdoch, and his son Barry Windham. Mulligan returned to the WWF as a full-time performer in 1984, hosting an interview segment titled Blackjack's Barbecue on WWF All-Star Wrestling, the counterpart to Roddy Piper's Piper's Pit.

In 1986, Mulligan wrestled under a mask as "Big Machine", part of a team with "The Giant Machine" (André the Giant) and "Super Machine" (Bill Eadie) collectively known as The Machines. They won several high-profile matches against the Heenan family, later recruiting members such as 'Hulk Machine' and 'Piper Machine'. After that angle ended, Mulligan wrestled for the WWF as himself, until he finally left in 1987. Later on, Jack traveled to Dallas and competed in World Class Championship Wrestling, wrestling against Bruiser Brody, Chris Adams and Kevin and Lance Von Erich. Mulligan also returned to Florida in 1987 to fight against the Funk brothers, teaming with Kevin Sullivan.

Mulligan worked as a match booker and promoter all around the South, eventually co-owning the Amarillo, Texas-based Western States Sports promotion with Dick Murdoch after purchasing it from Dory and Terry Funk. Mulligan and his Blackjacks partner, Jack Lanza were inducted into the WWE Hall of Fame on April 1, 2006, by their manager, Bobby Heenan.

Personal life 
In 1990, Blackjack Mulligan and his son Kendall Windham were arrested by the US Secret Service in a joint investigation with the Florida Department of Law Enforcement (FDLE) for counterfeiting. The authorities found close to $500,000 in phony $20 bills. As a result of a plea agreement, both father and son spent 24 months in a federal prison and were released in 1992.

In 2007, Windham published his book titled True Lies and Alibis, which tells about his personal life and his professional wrestling career.

In 2012, Windham, a born again Christian, was ordained a minister by Divine Hearts Ministry located in Lake Saint Louis, Missouri. He was very devoted to spending the time he had remaining to spreading the word of God. He felt his ordination could help him in this endeavor.

In July 2015, Windham was named as a defendant in a 2015 lawsuit filed by WWE after they received a letter from him indicating that he intended to sue them for concussion-based injuries sustained during his tenure with them.  He was represented by attorney Konstantine Kyros, who is involved in several other lawsuits involving former WWE wrestlers. Over two years after his death, US District Judge Vanessa Lynne Bryant dismissed the lawsuit in September 2018.

Death 
After dealing with health problems in recent years and being hospitalized with a heart attack several months earlier, Windham was hospitalized in Florida in October 2015. He died on April 7, 2016. He was buried at the Florida National Cemetery.

Legacy 
Mulligan's son Barry Windham wrestled as Blackjack Mulligan Jr early in his career.

His grandson Windham Rotunda is currently signed to WWE, performing under the name Bray Wyatt.

British wrestler Laurence (Laurie) Coulson (Coulton) was billed as "Black Jack Mulligan" (and related variants) while wrestling for Joint Promotions in the 1970s and 1980s.

Championships and accomplishments
Championship Wrestling from Florida
NWA Brass Knuckles Championship (Florida version) (1 time)
NWA United States Tag Team Championship (Florida version) (1 time) – with Dusty Rhodes
European Wrestling Union
EWU World Super Heavyweight Championship (1 time)
International Pro Wrestling
IWA World Tag Team Championship (1 time) – with Larry Hennig
International Wrestling Federation
IWF Heavyweight Championship (1 time)
Mid-Atlantic Championship Wrestling
NWA United States Heavyweight Championship (Mid-Atlantic version) (4 times)
NWA World Tag Team Championship (Mid-Atlantic version) (1 time) – with Ric Flair
NWA Big Time Wrestling
NWA American Heavyweight Championship (1 time)
NWA American Tag Team Championship (1 time) – with Blackjack Lanza
NWA Texas Heavyweight Championship (2 times)
NWA Texas Tag Team Championship (1 time) – with Blackjack Lanza
NWA Brass Knuckles Championship (Texas version) (1 time)
NWA Western States Sports
NWA International Heavyweight Championship (Amarillo version) (2 times)
NWA Western States Tag Team Championship (1 time) – with Dick Murdoch
Professional Wrestling Hall of Fame
Class of 2016 - Inducted as a member of The Blackjacks
Pro Wrestling Illustrated
PWI Most Inspirational Wrestler of the Year (1978)
PWI ranked him #159 of the 500 best singles wrestlers during the "PWI Years" in 2003.
World Wrestling Association
WWA World Heavyweight Championship (1 time)
WWA World Tag Team Championship (1 time) – with Blackjack Lanza
World Wide Wrestling Federation / World Wrestling Entertainment
WWWF Tag Team Championship (1 time) – with Blackjack Lanza
WWE Hall of Fame (Class of 2006) as a member of The Blackjacks
Wrestling Observer Newsletter
Most Disgusting Promotional Tactic (1984) Fake heart attack angle

References

External links 
 
 

1942 births
2016 deaths
American counterfeiters
American male professional wrestlers
Burials at Florida National Cemetery
New York Jets players
NWA/WCW/WWE United States Heavyweight Champions
People from Sweetwater, Texas
Players of American football from Texas
Professional Wrestling Hall of Fame and Museum
Professional wrestlers from Texas
Professional wrestling announcers
Professional wrestling trainers
The Heenan Family members
United States Marines
UTEP Miners football players
Western States Sports
WWE Hall of Fame inductees
Prisoners and detainees of the United States federal government
20th-century professional wrestlers
NWA Brass Knuckles Champions (Florida version)
WCWA Brass Knuckles Champions
WCW World Tag Team Champions